Constitution of 1958 may refer to:

French Constitution of 1958
United Arab Republic 1958 Constitution